Tell Neba'a Chaate is an archaeological site 6km north of Maakne in the Beqaa Mohafazat (Governorate) in Lebanon. It dates at least to the Early Bronze Age.

References

Baalbek District
Archaeological sites in Lebanon
Great Rift Valley